Countess is a black metal band from the Netherlands. Formed in 1992, they have released more than a dozen full-length albums and are considered one of the most eminent Dutch black metal bands. After years of being a solo project, as of 2014, they are a band again and play live.

Discography 
List of releases according to official website:

1992: Permafrost Demo
1993: The Gospel of the Horned One CD
1994: The Wolves Awake Demo
1994: Doomed to Live Livetape
1994: The Return of the Horned One CD
1995: The Wrath of Satan's Whore Cassette EP
1995: Ad Maiorem Sathanae Gloriam CD
1996: Live in Berlin Livetape
1996: The Book of the Heretic CD
1997: Hell's Rock & Roll MCD
2000: The Shining Swords of Hate CD
2001: The Revenge of the Horned One Part I CD
2002: The Revenge of the Horned One Part II CD
2003: Orgasmatron Split 7"
2004: Heilig Vuur CD
2005: Spawn of Steel CD
2006: Holocaust of the God Believers CD
2007: Blazing Flames of War CD
2010: Burning Scripture CD
2011: On Wings of Defiance CD
2013: Sermons of the Infidel Digital album
2014: Ancient Lies And Battle Cries CD
2014: Sermons of the Infidel CD
2014: Fires Of Destiny CD

References
"Countess." 

Official Homepage
Interview with Countess by The Metal Crypt

External links 
Official Homepage
Official MySpace

Dutch black metal musical groups
Musical groups established in 1992